Newport Girls' High School is an all-girls grammar school with academy status in Newport, Shropshire, England.  The school was opened in the 1919 by a group of female governesses as a single-sex day school for local girls. The school is selective and is an all-girls intake with an intake of 120 students per year. Previously, from 2003, the school took 56 students a year, rising to 84 in 2013 and increasing further to 90 in 2019. The school has also achieved Maths and Computing specialist status. It was named the ‘West Midlands State Secondary School of the Year’ in 2020 by the Sunday Times.

Houses
The state school originally had four houses, Curie, Cavell, Bronte and Keller, each named after a famous woman in history. The school recently changed these houses to 3 new houses, named Seacole, Roddam and Austen. Each house has a colour, Seacole (green), Roddam (yellow) and Austen (red) with a house captain from the sixth form assigned to each house. There are many events throughout the year in which the houses compete against each other to win the event, or in individual categories. These include competitions such as House Drama, House Bake Off, House Art/Photography, House Quiz, House Dance, House Board Games, House Charity and House Music, and also includes regular school events such as Sports Day. Students also participate in inter-house sports competitions, based on the half-term's focus. House captains are assigned to each house as well as sport captains these are typically members of sixth form.

At the end of each academic year there is a house point cup for houses with the highest number of house points. House points are gained by effort and contribution.

Head Girl Team
The Head Girl Team at Newport Girls High School contributes to the social and cultural operations of the school through charity events and other extracurricular projects. There is also a Lower School Head Girl Team with a similar role.

References

External links 
Newport Girls' High School official website

Girls' schools in Shropshire
Grammar schools in Telford and Wrekin
Newport, Shropshire
Academies in Telford and Wrekin
Buildings and structures in Newport, Shropshire
Educational institutions established in 1919
1919 establishments in England